The National Union of Gold, Silver and Allied Trades (NUGSAT) was a trade union in Britain and Ireland.  It represented workers in precious metals, jewellers, diamond polishers, electroplaters, watch and clock repairers and dental technicians.

The union was founded in Sheffield in 1910 as the Amalgamated Society of Gold, Silver and Kindred Trades, merging several local societies both in Sheffield and Dublin.  In 1914, it merged with the Birmingham Silversmiths and Electroplate Operatives union, assuming its final name.

Membership remained low for many years - just over 200 in 1920, and fewer than 100 in 1930.  It merged with the Society of Goldsmiths, Jewellers and Kindred Trades in 1969, pushing membership up to 250.   The union's Irish members transferred to the Irish Transport and General Workers' Union in 1976, but membership of the union generally increased; by 1979, it had risen to 2,308.  In 1981, NUGSAT was absorbed into the Technical, Administrative and Supervisory Section.

General Secretaries
1911: William Kean
1953: J. Edley
1962: J. W. Hodgkinson
1980s: Brian Bridge

See also
National Union of Gold, Silver, and Allied Trades v Albury Brothers Ltd

References

Defunct trade unions of the United Kingdom
Defunct trade unions of Ireland
Trade unions established in 1910
Trade unions disestablished in 1981
Metal trade unions
1910 establishments in the United Kingdom
Trade unions based in South Yorkshire